Megachile pictiventris is a species of bee in the family Megachilidae. It was described by Smith in 1879. It resides along the coast of Australia.

References

Pictiventris
Insects described in 1879